The Leo Dandurand Trophy is a Canadian Football League trophy awarded to the Most Outstanding Lineman in the East Division.  The winner of this trophy is chosen from a group of nominees, one from each team in the East Division. Either the winner of this trophy or the winner of the DeMarco-Becket Memorial Trophy will also receive the Canadian Football League Most Outstanding Offensive Lineman Award.

In 1995, as part of the failed American Expansion, this trophy was given to the South Division's Most Outstanding Lineman.

Prior to 1974 the CFL's Most Outstanding Lineman Award was awarded to both outstanding defensive players and outstanding linemen in the East Division.

The trophy is named after Leo Dandurand, co-founder of the Montreal Alouettes.

Leo Dandurand Trophy winners

 2022 – Brandon Revenberg (OG), Hamilton Tiger-Cats
 2021 – Brandon Revenberg (OG), Hamilton Tiger-Cats
 2020 – season cancelled - covid 19
 2019 – Chris Van Zeyl (OT), Hamilton Tiger-Cats
 2018 – Brandon Revenberg (OG), Hamilton Tiger-Cats
 2017 – Sean McEwen (C), Toronto Argonauts
 2016 – Jon Gott (C), Ottawa Redblacks
 2015 – SirVincent Rogers (OT), Ottawa Redblacks
 2014 – Jeff Perrett (OT), Montreal Alouettes
 2013 – Jeff Keeping (C), Toronto Argonauts
 2012 – Josh Bourke (OT), Montreal Alouettes
 2011 – Josh Bourke (OT), Montreal Alouettes
 2010 – Marwan Hage (C), Hamilton Tiger-Cats
 2009 – Scott Flory (OG), Montreal Alouettes
 2008 – Scott Flory (OG), Montreal Alouettes
 2007 – Dan Goodspeed (OT), Winnipeg Blue Bombers
 2006 – Scott Flory (OG), Montreal Alouettes
 2005 – Scott Flory (OG), Montreal Alouettes
 2004 – Uzooma Okeke (OT), Montreal Alouettes
 2003 – Scott Flory (OG), Montreal Alouettes
 2002 – Bryan Chiu (C), Montreal Alouettes
 2001 – Dave Mudge (OT), Winnipeg Blue Bombers
 2000 – Pierre Vercheval (OG), Montreal Alouettes
 1999 – Uzooma Okeke (OT), Montreal Alouettes
 1998 – Uzooma Okeke (OT), Montreal Alouettes
 1997 – Mike Kiselak (C), Toronto Argonauts
 1996 – Mike Kiselak (C), Toronto Argonauts
 1995 – Mike Withycombe (OG), Baltimore Stallions
 1994 – Shar Pourdanesh (OT), Baltimore CFLers
 1993 – Chris Walby (OT), Winnipeg Blue Bombers
 1992 – Robert Smith (OT), Ottawa Rough Riders
 1991 – Chris Walby (OT), Winnipeg Blue Bombers
 1990 – Chris Walby (OT), Winnipeg Blue Bombers
 1989 – Miles Gorrell (OT), Hamilton Tiger-Cats
 1988 – Ian Beckstead (C), Toronto Argonauts
 1987 – Chris Walby (OT), Winnipeg Blue Bombers
 1986 – Miles Gorrell (OT), Hamilton Tiger-Cats
 1985 – Dan Ferrone (OG), Toronto Argonauts
 1984 – Dan Ferrone (OG), Toronto Argonauts
 1983 – Rudy Phillips (OG), Ottawa Rough Riders
 1982 – Rudy Phillips (OG), Ottawa Rough Riders
 1981 – Val Belcher (OG), Ottawa Rough Riders
 1980 – Val Belcher (OG), Ottawa Rough Riders
 1979 – Ray Watrin (OG), Montreal Alouettes
 1978 – Jim Coode (OT), Ottawa Rough Riders
 1977 – Mike Wilson (OT), Toronto Argonauts
 1976 – Dan Yochum (OT), Montreal Alouettes
 1975 – Dave Braggins (OG), Montreal Alouettes

Outstanding Lineman in the East Division prior to the trophy

 1974 – Ed George (OG), Montreal Alouettes

CFL's Most Outstanding Lineman Award in the East Division prior to the 1974

 1973 – Ed George (OG), Montreal Alouettes
 1972 – Jim Stillwagon (DL), Toronto Argonauts
 1971 – Mark Kosmos (LB), Montreal Alouettes
 1970 – Angelo Mosca (DL), Hamilton Tiger-Cats
 1969 – Billy Joe Booth (DE), Ottawa Rough Riders
 1968 – Ken Lehmann (LB), Ottawa Rough Riders
 1967 – John Barrow (DL), Hamilton Tiger-Cats
 1966 – Ken Lehmann (LB), Ottawa Rough Riders
 1965 – John Barrow (DL), Hamilton Tiger-Cats
 1964 – John Barrow (DL), Hamilton Tiger-Cats
 1963 – Angelo Mosca (DL), Hamilton Tiger-Cats
 1962 – John Barrow (DL), Hamilton Tiger-Cats
 1961 – John Barrow (DL), Hamilton Tiger-Cats
 1960 – Kaye Vaughan (OT), Ottawa Rough Riders
 1959 – John Barrow (DL), Hamilton Tiger-Cats
 1958 – Jackie Simpson (OG), Montreal Alouettes
 1957 – Kaye Vaughan (OT), Ottawa Rough Riders
 1956 – Kaye Vaughan (OT), Ottawa Rough Riders
 1955 – Tex Coulter (OL), Montreal & Vince Scott, Hamilton

References
CFL Publications: 2018 Facts, Figures & Records

Canadian Football League trophies and awards